Cyclopis is a genus of moths in the family Erebidae.

References
Natural History Museum Lepidoptera genus database

Calpinae